Pete McRae is an American rock guitarist.

Born Robert F. McRae, Jr. in Austin, Texas in 1955, McRae and his family moved to California when he was aged ten.  Pete graduated from Terra Linda High School, in Marin County, in 1973. He began serious guitar studies with Paul Miller, in Terra Linda, and with Dave Smith, in San Francisco. He went on to study with Jerry Hahn, David Creamer, and Barry Finnerty in the Bay Area. He got his first real performing experience in a Sonoma County band called Synergy (not to be confused with the Larry Fast projects under that name).

In the fall of 1976 he migrated to Los Angeles. There he performed in original and cover bands with many soon-to-be illustrious artists and musicians, and early on became a founding member of The Kats.  When The Kats big record deal fizzled terribly, McRae took offers to be a "guitar-slinger for hire", and seemed to be on track for a successful session career. In fact, prior to joining The Kats, he had some national exposure touring and recording with Cory Wells, from Three Dog Night.

In 1982, disenchanted by what seemed like 'type-casting' in the work he was getting, McRae sought training and artistic growth in the Music Department at USC. There, he met and worked with Dr. Robert S. Moore, in composition, and with William Kanengiser, in guitar, for a brief period. (Dr. Moore also inspired McRae to take an interest in martial arts training, albeit from a pacifistic, meditative standpoint.) He was very pleased to be on the roster of the great Ted Greene's jazz guitar students, for a time. It was at USC that his interest in Harry Partch and a comprehensive art form including music, dance, drama, poetry, and visual design took hold, and he left school, convinced -perhaps erroneously- that the only meaningful way to continue his studies was outside the academy.

From 1984 to 1993 he resumed his "guitar-slinging" while pursuing his own songwriting, singing, and composition. In the late 1980s he finally tracked down Danlee Mitchell, who set him on the path that led to Kraig Grady, and his mentor Erv Wilson. Mr. Mitchell was kind enough, too, to loan Pete one of Harry Partch's own instruments. From c. 1988 to 1993 Pete performed all over the Los Angeles area with Kraig Grady, playing a purely acoustic music in just intonation. But it seemed like every time Kraig set down to record, Pete went on tour. So it was not until Kraig's fourth CD, The Stolen Stars, that he is actually credited as a performer.

In 1993, he returned to the Bay Area, performing and recording with Boris Dig, East Of Eden, Gary Claxton, Brandi Shearer, and Ted Savarese. It was during this period of career questioning that Pete became interested in teaching, inspired by the work of Rudolf Steiner. This led to a broadening and deepening of his interest in literature and language, as well as providing training courses in painting, drawing, sculpture, movement, and speech.

In 2000, he went again to Los Angeles, where he renewed his interests in microtonal music and instrument construction, with Kraig Grady. He also worked and trained with some of the technicians he had met as a rock performer, with an eye towards original instrument creations.

In 2001, following the death of his father, he moved back to Northern California, where he completed his undergraduate studies, with a degree in Music Education from Sonoma State University.

He is currently living and working in Philadelphia, Pennsylvania, where he has recorded and performed with Gina Ferrera, Rented Mule, and Todd Horton's ROMP.

He has been known -from his LA days- to have worked with:
Roach and the White Boys,
Josie Cotton,
Billy Rankin,
Bobbyzio,
The Kat Club,
Connie Stevens,
Eddie Jobson (Roxy Music; Zappa),
Mr. Mister,
Peter Kingsbery (Cock Robin),
David Baerwald, and
Stan Ridgway.
He also toured with The Rembrandts, playing Cello and Mandolin and with the Tom Petty tribute band, Petty Theft.

Discography 

 L.A. In - (compilation) Rhino Records featuring The Kats – 1979
 Get Modern - (unreleased) by The Kats – 1979
 The Faraghers - Polydor Records by The Faraghers – 1980
 Minimum Wage Rock & Roll - Arista Records by The BusBoys – 1980
 Full Grown Child - Dreamland Records by Holly Penfield – 1980 (pictured, but hired after the recording)
 Convertible Music - Elektra Records by Josie Cotton – 1982
 Back to Avalon - Columbia Records by Kenny Loggins – 1988
 A Different Man - Barclay Records by Peter Kingsbery – 1991
 The Real Ramona - 4AD Records by Throwing Muses – 1991
 Hang Out Your Poetry - DGC Records by Ceremony (feat. Chaz Bono) – 1993 (pictured, but hired after the recording)
 The Stolen Stars: An Anaphorian Dance Drama - by Kraig Grady (Archive Of Anaphoria) 2003
 los angelenos - General Records by The Kat Club – 2007
 LIVE! 1991 "poolside with gilly" - A440 Records by Stan Ridgway – 2007
 Footpaths and Trade Routes - ini itu Records by Anaphoria (Kraig Grady) – 2009
 The Philadelphia Gyil Fusion Project - by Gina Ferrera – 2009
 X - by Rented Mule – 2009
 Pull - by Mr. Mister – 2010 (licensed self-release of 1990 recording)
 Play It Loud - soulsearchmusic by ROMP (Todd Horton) – 2011

Related artists (people Pete has worked with) 
The Kats
Connie Stevens
Josie Cotton
Billy Rankin
Eddie Jobson
Mr. Mister
Peter Kingsbery
David Baerwald
Stan Ridgway
The Rembrandts
The Kat Club

References

Singers from Texas
Living people
1955 births
American rock guitarists
American male guitarists
American male singers
Guitarists from Texas
20th-century American guitarists
20th-century American male musicians